Colonel George Fane  (c. 1616 – April 1663) was an English politician who sat in the House of Commons at various times between 1640 and 1663. He was Lord of the Manor of Hunningham. He fought in the Royalist army in the English Civil War.

Colonel the Hon. George Fane was the fifth but fourth surviving son of Francis Fane, 1st Earl of Westmorland and his wife, Mary Mildmay (died 1640), daughter and heir of Sir Anthony Mildmay of Apethorpe, Northamptonshire. He was educated at Eton College from 1627 to 1632 and matriculated from Emmanuel College, Cambridge in 1632. He travelled abroad from 1635 to 1638, visiting Italy.

In 1640, Fane was elected Member of Parliament (MP) for Callington in Cornwall, a seat controlled by the Rolle family of Heanton Satchville, Petrockstowe. By 1642, he was a Captain of an Irish foot regiment and was Royalist lieutenant colonel by 1643. He was colonel of a foot regiment from 1644 to 1649 and fought as a colonel at Marston Moor.

Fane acquired the mortgage, in trust for his son, of a Thameside Berkshire estate at Basildon House in 1656 in the names of his sister, Rachael Fane (styled Lady Bath) (who may have supplied the money) and his nephew, Charles Fane, Lord le Despenser (later the third Earl of Westmorland and 10th Baron le Despencer). Following the Restoration he was a Justice of the Peace and a Deputy Lieutenant for Berkshire until his death. He was a Commissioner for assessment for Warwickshire from August 1660 to 1661 and one for Berkshire from 1661 to 1663.

In 1661 Fane was elected MP for Wallingford in the Cavalier Parliament. He was one of the most active Members in the opening sessions of the parliament, serving on 84 committees.

Fane died in the parish of St Andrew's, Hatton Garden and was buried in St Bartholomew-the-Great, Smithfield on 25 April 1663, a church which had close links to his mother's family.

Fane married, by 1650, Dorothy Horsey (born c. 19 August 1630) daughter and heir of James Horsey (died 1630) of Honington (Hunningham), Warwickshire. That property was sold in 1690 and 1695). He was survived by his son Sir Henry Fane, KB and his wife who later remarried.

References

R. de Salis, Quadrennial di Fano Saliceorum, volume one, London, 2003
Basil Duke Henning, The History of Parliament, The House of Commons 1660-1690, H.P.T., Secker & Warburg, London, 1983.
(other printed (GEC), manuscript & family knowledge

 

1616 births
1663 deaths
People from Basildon, Berkshire
People from Warwickshire
Younger sons of earls
People educated at Eton College
Alumni of Emmanuel College, Cambridge
Members of the Parliament of England for Callington
English MPs 1640–1648
English MPs 1661–1679
George, Col. the Hon.
Members of the Parliament of England for Wallingford
English justices of the peace